Heraj (also Romanized as Haraj and Harj) is a village in Asir Rural District, Asir District, Mohr County, Fars Province, Iran. At the 2006 census, its population was 725, in 156 families.

References 

Populated places in Mohr County